Isaac Smith (January 4, 1761 – April 4, 1834) was a United States Representative from Pennsylvania.

Biography
Irwin was born in Chester County, Pennsylvania.  He engaged in agricultural pursuits near Level Corners, Pennsylvania.  He was a member of the Pennsylvania House of Representatives from 1806 to 1808.

Smith was elected as a Republican to the Thirteenth Congress.  He resumed agricultural pursuits and also engaged in the occupation of millwright.  He died on his farm at Level Corners, near Jersey Shore, Pennsylvania, in 1834.  Interment in the Pine Creek Presbyterian Churchyard, reinterment in Jersey Shore Cemetery, Jersey Shore, Lycoming County, Pennsylvania.

Sources

The Political Graveyard

External links 
 

1761 births
1834 deaths
Members of the Pennsylvania House of Representatives
Democratic-Republican Party members of the United States House of Representatives from Pennsylvania